2741 Valdivia is a background asteroid from the central regions of the asteroid belt, approximately  in diameter. It was discovered on 1 December 1975, by Chilean astronomers Carlos Torres and Sergio Barros at the Cerro El Roble Station northwest of Santiago de Chile. The asteroid was named after Spanish conquistador Pedro de Valdivia.

Orbit and classification 

Valdivia is a non-family asteroid from the main belt's background population. It orbits the Sun in the central main-belt at a distance of 2.1–3.1 AU once every 4 years and 3 months (1,540 days). Its orbit has an eccentricity of 0.18 and an inclination of 10° with respect to the ecliptic.

Naming 

This minor planet was named after Spanish conquistador Pedro de Valdivia (1502–1553), who conquered Chile with a small expedition corps after he served under Francisco Pizarro in Peru. Valdivia founded the cities Santiago (1541) and Concepción (1550) and became Chile's first royal governor. The city of Valdivia in southern Chile is also named after him. The official naming citation was published by the Minor Planet Center on 26 March 1986.

Physical characteristics

Rotation period 

In August 2016, the so-far best-rated rotational lightcurve of Valdivia was obtained by the Spanish amateur astronomer group OBAS. Lightcurve analysis gave a rotation period of 4.098 hours with a brightness variation of 0.25 magnitude. Previously, in May 2003, photometric observations made by Donald P. Pray at the Carbuncle Hill Observatory  near Providence, Rhode Island, gave a synodic period of 4.096 hours and an amplitude of 0.40 in magnitude. In addition astronomers at the Palomar Transient Factory found a period of 4.096 hours with an amplitude of 0.28 om May 2011, and French amateur astronomer René Roy obtained a period of 8.1922 hours (twice the period solution) with an amplitude of 0.36.

Poles 

In 2016, an international study modeled a lightcurve with a concurring period of  hours and found two spin axes of (269.0°, −31.0°) and (103.0°, −59.0°) in ecliptic coordinates (λ, β).

Diameter and albedo 

According to the survey carried out by the NEOWISE mission of NASA's Wide-field Infrared Survey Explorer, Valdivia measures between 9.13 and 11.679 kilometers in diameter and its surface has an albedo between 0.205 and 0.404, while the Japanese Akari satellite found an albedo of 0.244 and a diameter of 10.73 kilometers. The Collaborative Asteroid Lightcurve Link assumes an albedo of 0.10 – a compromise value between the carbonaceous (0.057) and stony (0.20) asteroids – and calculates a diameter of 17.52 kilometers based on an absolute magnitude of 11.9.

References

External links 
 Lightcurve Database Query (LCDB), at www.minorplanet.info
 Dictionary of Minor Planet Names, Google books
 Asteroids and comets rotation curves, CdR – Geneva Observatory, Raoul Behrend
 Discovery Circumstances: Numbered Minor Planets (1)-(5000) – Minor Planet Center
 
 

002741
Discoveries by Carlos Torres (astronomer)
Discoveries by Sergio Barros
Named minor planets
19751201